Maleno may refer to:

 Helena Maleno (born 1970), Spanish human rights defender, journalist, researcher, documentalist, and writer
 Maleno Martínez, Cuban third baseman